Houda Abouz is a Moroccan rapper and women's rights advocate, known by her stage name  (in Moroccan Arabic, meaning "your sister").

Biography
She majored in film studies at the Abdelmalek Essaâdi University in Tétouan. In November 2020, she was announced as one of the BBC's 100 Women for 2020.

References

Moroccan rappers
21st-century women rappers
Moroccan women's rights activists
Year of birth missing (living people)
1990s births
Living people
BBC 100 Women
People from Khemisset
Abdelmalek Essaâdi University alumni